portable engine
 steam aircraft
 (steam ball) aeolipile
 (steam bath) sauna
 steam brig
 steam bus
 steam cannon
 steam car
 steam crane
 steam donkey
 steam dummy (dummy engine)
 (steam electric power plant) fossil fuel power plant (FFPP)
 (steam electrolysis) high-temperature electrolysis
 steam engine
 stationary steam engine
 steam explosion
 steam fair
 Steam generator (boiler) steam generator
 Steam generator (nuclear power)
 steam hammer
 steam locomotive
 steam locomotive nomenclature
 steam locomotives of British Railways
 Steam Locomotives of Ireland
 steam power during the Industrial Revolution
 steam railroad
 steam reforming
 steam rupture
 steam shovel
 (steam sterilizer) autoclave
 steam tank (vehicle)
 steam tractor
 (steam train)–see steam locomotive
 steam tricycle
 steam turbine
 steam turbine locomotive
 steamboat
 steamroller
 steam whistle
 traction engine

See also 

 List of environment topics
 :Category:Steam road vehicles

Steam energy topics